The Senate Foreign Relations Subcommittee on International Development, Multilateral Institutions, and International Economic, Energy and Environmental Policy is one of seven subcommittees of the Senate Foreign Relations Committee.

Jurisdiction
The subcommittee’s responsibilities include general oversight responsibility for U.S. multilateral international development policy, multilateral foreign assistance, and all U.S. mandatory and voluntary contributions to international organizations and relationship with such entities, including the U.N. and its affiliated agencies. The subcommittee’s responsibilities also include matters related to international monetary policy, including U.S. participation in international financial institutions and trade organizations, U.S. foreign economic policy, including export enhancement and trade promotion, international investment, international trade, protection of intellectual property, and technology transfer, as well as international energy policy and environmental policy, including matters related to the oceans and the Arctic.

Members, 117th Congress

See also
U.S. House Foreign Affairs Subcommittee on Asia, the Pacific, and the Global Environment
U.S. House Foreign Affairs Subcommittee on International Organizations, Human Rights, and Oversight

External links
Senate Committee on Foreign Relations
Senate Foreign Relations Committee subcommittees and jurisdictions

Foreign Relations Senate International Development and Foreign Assistance, Economic Affairs, and International Environmental Protection